Carpenter Summit is a highway pass name approved through the United States Geological Survey. This pass was created during the construction of I-8 from 1972 to 1974 in this area, but was never named unlike the three other  then named during construction. The name “Carpenter Summit” was proposed in late 2019 then submitted and as of October 2020 pending the various levels of place name acceptance.

Google Street view of I-8 East bound 4,000 foot elevation sign.
 Google Street view of I-8 West bound 4,000 foot elevation sign.

Of the four  highway summits eastward of San Diego, the Laguna Summit is the second. The third is Crestwood Summit followed by the Tecate Divide.

Construction

The Interstate 8 route was realigned from Arnold Way onto Alpine Boulevard as it passed through Alpine and the Viejas Indian Reservation, before entering the Laguna Mountains and the Cleveland National Forest mostly paralleling the alignment used by old US 80.

By August 1970, the remainder of the freeway had been funded in this area, with the part from Japatul Valley Road to Laguna Junction costing $22 million (about $ in  dollars),  (about $ in  dollars).

The new Pine Valley Creek bridge and the segment extending from Japatul Valley Road to Pine Valley was dedicated on November 24, 1974, and was scheduled to open on November 26; this left  of freeway to be constructed. The final stretch of I-8 in California, from Sunrise Highway to La Posta Road, was completed in May 1975.

References

See also 

Interstate 8 at California Highways
Interstate 8 at the Interstate Guide
Interstate 8 in California and Arizona at AA Roads

Mountain passes of California
Interstate 8
Mountain ranges of San Diego County, California